Mga Anak ni Facifica Falayfay is a 1987 Filipino film that is a sequel to the 1969 movie Facifica Falayfay starring Dolphy. It was written by Tony Mortel and Roy Vera Cruz and directed by Romy Villaflor.

The movies tell the story of a lovable gay character created by Mars Ravelo in his series of comic book stories. The sequel picks up Facifica Falayfay's story after he falls in love with Ligaya at the end of the first movie.

Zsa Zsa Padilla was introduced in the movie, and was referred to as Ligaya's (Pilar Pilapil) look-alike and his new leading lady.

Plot
After Facifica (Dolphy) straightens his sexual preference and becomes a straight man, he reverts to his old name Pacifico and becomes a doting husband to Ligaya (Pilar Pilapil) and a generous father to his three sons played by Eric (Eric Quizon), Rolando "Rolly" (Rolly Quizon), and Rodrigo (Roderick Paulate). Unfortunately, after Ligaya dies Rodrigo is affected so much that later on he finds out he is more female at heart than his brothers. Rodrigo has come to terms with his homosexuality and tries to gain acceptance from his father.

Cristina (Zsa Zsa Padilla) marries Pacifico. Rodrigo finds out that his father used to be gay even though Facifica refuses to admit it. Facifica eventually comes to terms with his son's sexuality.

Cast
 Dolphy as PCpl. Pacifico Manalastas/Facifica Falayfay
 Roderick Paulate as Rodrigo Manalastas
 Zsa Zsa Padilla Cristina Mendoza
 Rolly Quizon as Rolly Manalastas
 Eric Quizon as Eric Manalastas
 Panchito SSgt. Tamboyong
 Babalu as Chief Acosta
 Bayani Casimiro as Mayor
 Lotlot De Leon
 Charlie Davao
 Rose Ann Gonzales

Awards and nominations

See also
Facifica Falayfay

References

External links
 

1987 LGBT-related films
1987 films
Philippine LGBT-related films